Lubienia  is a village in the administrative district of Gmina Popielów, within Opole County, Opole Voivodeship, in south-western Poland.

The village has a population of 408.

References

Lubienia